Belpasso is a comune (municipality) in the Metropolitan City of Catania in the Italian region Sicily, located about  southeast of Palermo and about  northwest of Catania. Belpasso is the second biggest comune of the Catania's area for area (after Catania).

The original town was destroyed by the lava flows from Mount Etna in 1669. Rebuilt in a lower plain, that habitation was known as Fenice Moncada; the latter name derives from the family of the Princes of Paterno who owned the feud. This habitation proved malarial and was heavily damaged by the 1693 Sicily earthquake, causing the spot to be  abandoned and named Malpasso, and the present town was founded in 1695 in lands belonging to the Duke of Montalto.

Belpasso is the native city of Stefania Spampinato, known for her role in station 19  as Carina Deluca Nino Martoglio and Condorelli, productor of typical Sicilian sweets, exported in all parts of the world, Condorelli is the owner of a bar franchising, mainly located in Catania's area. Matteo Renzi chose Condorelli's main bar, in northern Belpasso (known as "Borrello"), during his visit in Italian's main commercial activities.

Belpasso borders the following municipalities: Adrano, Biancavilla, Bronte, Camporotondo Etneo, Castiglione di Sicilia, Catania, Lentini, Maletto, Mascalucia, Motta Sant'Anastasia, Nicolosi, Paternò, Ragalna, Ramacca, Randazzo, San Pietro Clarenza, Sant'Alfio, Zafferana Etnea.

References

External links
 Official website

Cities and towns in Sicily